

National leagues

Primera División

Apertura champion: Danubio (3rd title)
Top scorer: Héctor AcuñaIván AlonsoSergio Blanco (11 goals each)
Clausura champion: M. Wanderers (1st title)
Top scorer: Héctor AcuñaOctavio RiveroJonathan ÁlvezNicolás Royón (9 goals each)
Overall champion: Danubio (4th title)
Top scorer: Héctor Acuña (20 goals)
International qualifiers:
Copa Libertadores: 
Group Stage: Danubio and M. Wanderers
Preliminary Round: Nacional
Copa Sudamericana:
First Stage: Danubio, River Plate, Peñarol and Rentistas
Relegated: Liverpool, Cerro Largo and Miramar Misiones

Segunda División

Segunda División champion: Tacuarembó (1st title)
Play-off winner: Rampla Juniors
Promoted: Tacuarembó, Atenas and Rampla Juniors
Top scorer: Aldo Díaz

Clubs in international competitions

El Tanque Sisley
2013 Copa Sudamericana

El Tanque eliminated on points 0–6.

Wanderers
2013 Copa Sudamericana

Wanderers eliminated on points 1–4.

Peñarol
2013 Copa Sudamericana

Peñarol lost 0–2 on aggregate.

River Plate
2013 Copa Sudamericana

River Plate lost 0–1 on aggregate.

National Teams

Senior Team
This section covers Uruguay's senior team matches from the end of the 2013 FIFA Confederations Cup to the end of the 2014 FIFA World Cup.

Friendly matches

World Cup qualifiers

FIFA World Cup

References

External links
AUF
Uruguay on FIFA.com